Newport East is a constituency in the city of Newport, South Wales, represented in the House of Commons of the UK Parliament since 2005 by Jessica Morden of the Labour Party.

Boundaries

1983–1997: The Borough of Newport wards 2, 4, 7, 9, 11, 13, and 18 to 20, and the District of Monmouth wards 14 and 15.

1997–2010: The Borough of Newport wards of Alway, Beechwood, Langstone, Liswerry, Llanwern, Ringland, St Julian's, and Victoria, and the Borough of Monmouth wards of Caldicot Castle, Dewstow, Magor with Undy, Rogiet, Severn, and West End.

2010–present: The Newport County Borough electoral divisions of Alway, Beechwood, Langstone, Liswerry, Llanwern, Ringland, St Julian's, and Victoria, and the Monmouthshire County electoral divisions of Caldicot Castle, Dewstow, Green Lane, Mill, Rogiet, Severn, The Elms, and West End.

History
Newport East was created when the former Newport borough constituency was split into two divisions in 1983. It also included some rural areas formerly part of Monmouth county constituency. There have been only minor boundary changes since the constituency was created, and unlike the neighbouring Newport West, has remained Labour since its creation.

Members of Parliament

Elections

Elections in the 1980s

Elections in the 1990s

Elections in the 2000s

Elections in the 2010s

Of the 68 rejected ballots:
34 were either unmarked or it was uncertain who the vote was for.
19 voted for more than one candidate.
15 had writing or mark by which the voter could be identified.

Of the 80 rejected ballots:
61 were either unmarked or it was uncertain who the vote was for.
19 voted for more than one candidate.

See also
 Newport East (Senedd constituency)
 Newport West (Senedd constituency)
 List of parliamentary constituencies in Gwent
 List of parliamentary constituencies in Wales

Notes

References

External links
Politics Resources (Election results from 1922 onwards)
Electoral Calculus (Election results from 1955 onwards)
2017 Election House Of Commons Library 2017 Election report
A Vision Of Britain Through Time (Constituency elector numbers)

Parliamentary constituencies in South Wales
Politics of Newport, Wales
Constituencies of the Parliament of the United Kingdom established in 1983